No. 205 (Heavy Bomber) Group was a long-range, heavy bomber group of the Royal Air Force (RAF) established on 23 October 1941 by boosting No. 257 Wing to Group status.

Tri-force model
During the North Africa Campaign in Egypt and Libya, No. 205 (Heavy Bomber) Group under Air Commodore Alan P. Ritchie was coordinated successfully with No. 201 (Naval Co-operation) Group under Air Vice Marshal Hugh Lloyd, and Air Headquarters (H.Q.) Western Desert under Air Vice Marshal Arthur Coningham. 

This model which separated the command into strategic, coastal, and tactical air forces was presented to the Casablanca planners by Tedder who along with primarily Ritchie, Lloyd, and especially Coningham, implemented and developed the tri-force model in Egypt and Libya during 1942. No. 205 Group contributed significantly to these developments.

At the Casablanca Conference in January 1943, British Prime Minister Winston Churchill, American President Franklin D. Roosevelt, and their staffs reorganized the Allied air forces in the North African and Mediterranean Theater of Operations on this model. The result of this reorganization was the Mediterranean Air Command commanded by Air Chief Marshal Sir Arthur Tedder and its major sub-command, the Northwest African Air Forces (NAAF) under Lieutenant General Carl Spaatz, was structured according to the tri-force model.

No. 205 Group units were part of the attempted resupply of the Polish Home Army during the Warsaw Uprising Airlift.

Order of battle
In the MAC organization following the Casablanca Conference, No. 205 Group was part of the Northwest African Strategic Air Force (NASAF), an Allied command under Major General James H. Doolittle consisting of American (daytime) and British (primarily nighttime) long-range heavy bomber units. NASAF, along with the Northwest African Coastal Air Force (NACAF) and the Northwest African Tactical Air Force (NATAF), formed a complete tri-force under a single unified command (NAAF). The components of No. 205 Group at various times during World War II are illustrated below.

Unfortunately, many of the records of No. 205 Group are apparently unavailable for the period prior to the air force reorganization in February 1943 (Mediterranean Air Command).

Notes:
A/Cdre = Air Commodore
RAAF = Royal Australian Air Force
RCAF = Royal Canadian Air Force
SAAF = South African Air Force
MASAF = Mediterranean Allied Strategic Air Force under Major General Nathan Twining was a sub-command of the Mediterranean Allied Air Forces.

It is not absolutely certain which RAF squadrons were operating in No. 205 Group during the summer of 1942. American heavy bomber units began arriving in the Middle East at this time. The first was Colonel Harry A. Halverson's detachment of B-24 Liberators known as the Halverson Project (HALPRO). On 12 June 1942, thirteen B-24s of the Halverson Detachment bombed the Ploesti oil refineries in Romania. This was the first strategic bombing mission by an American unit in World War II. On 28 June 1942, Major General Lewis H. Brereton arrived from India with the 9th Bombardment Squadron of B-17 Flying Fortresses. The Halverson Detachment and the 9th Bombardment Squadron were both under control of No. 205 (Heavy Bomber) Group for target selection and operations. 

"Between 26 June and 5 July, nine missions were flown, all but one against Tobruk. The B-17's of the 9th Squadron participated in two attacks, one by night, and the B-24's (Halverson's Detachment), sometimes in company with the RAF's Liberator squadron (No. 160 Squadron), also operated both by day and by night."

RAF operational control of the American heavy bomber units continued even after Halverson's Detachment of B-24s and Brereton's 9th Bombardment Squadron of B-17s were consolidated to form the 1st Provisional Bombardment Group on 20 July 1942 under Halverson's command. When the American 98th Bombardment Group with four squadrons of B-24s arrived and began flying combat missions in August 1942, the RAF selected its mission targets as well. This situation caused some concern among officers of the 9th Air Force's IX Bomber Command and the United States Army Middle East Air Force (USAMEAF).

When MAC was disbanded on 10 December 1943, No. 205 Group was assigned to the Mediterranean Allied Strategic Air Force. No. 205 Group eventually converted to Consolidated B-24 Liberator aircraft, and remained under Simpson's command for the duration of the Second World War.

Postwar
Immediately as the war ended the group headquarters was at Heliopolis, and it appears to have included the Lancasters which at that time formed MEDME's strike force. The squadrons concerned appear to have been Nos 37 and 38 Squadrons, both located at Ein Shemer in Palestine. Both squadrons appear to have been moved to Malta as the final withdrawal from Palestine began after October 1947.

Commanders from 1945 were:
30 April 1945 : AVM Andrew McKee
1 February 1947 : AVM George Stacey Hodson
20 October 1949 : AVM Victor Groom
6 February 1952 : No appointment
6 July 1952 : AVM Harold Vivian Satterley
30 June 1954 : AVM Denis Barnett

The group headquarters was established at RAF Fayid in 1947, and appears to have included Nos 13, 39, and 208 Squadrons, respectively flying Spitfire XVIIIs, photo-reconnaissance Mosquitos, and night-fighter Mosquitos, at that time. No. 78 Wing RAAF (Nos 75 and 76 Squadrons) with Vickers Vampires operated under the group's control from RAF Hal Far, Malta during the early 1950s.

On 7 June 1952, the AOC 205 Group, Air Vice Marshal David Atcherley disappeared during a flight over the eastern Mediterranean.

No. 205 Group was made responsible for supervising the evacuation programme for the RAF from the Canal Zone from 1953. Air Vice Marshal Barnett moved his rear headquarters over to Cyprus in October 1955, and Abu Sueir was the last station to be handed over to the Egyptians. This was despite the fact that Abu Sueir and Fanara were the two bases to be retained, to be maintained by civilian contractors. Abu Sueir was handed over to Egypt on 14 April 1956, and the group was disbanded at Ismaila (Lee FFME 29) the following day.

References

Bibliography

 
 
 
 
 
 

Royal Air Force groups
205
Military units and formations established in 1941
Military units and formations disestablished in 1956